The Electoral Circle, which was renamed in 1807 as the Wittenberg Circle, was a historical territory that mostly emerged from the heartlands of the former Duchy of Saxe-Wittenberg. The circle (or district) was created in the reign of Frederick the Wise of Saxony in 1499 and was part of the Electorate of Saxony. The German name  referred to the electoral dignity or status of the Saxon prince electors to whom this territory was linked.

Geographical extent 
The region of the Electoral Circle today falls largely within the states of Brandenburg and Saxony-Anhalt. A smaller portion is located in North Saxony.

The rivers Elbe, Black Elster and, for a short section, Mulde flowed through the Circle. The most important settlement in the Circle was the town of Wittenberg, where the Reformation started.

History 
John Frederick the Magnanimous was defeated by Emperor Charles V in the Schmalkaldic War at the Battle of Mühlberg and was captured there on 24 April 1547. The emperor removed his electoral dignity and part of his electoral estates and enfeoffed them to his cousin Maurice of Saxony. As a result, Saxe-Wittenberg was transferred from the Ernestines to the Albertine line of the family.

Maurice of Saxony embarked on a reorganisation of his Electorate. Alongside six other circles, the Electoral Circle was formed, with its capital at Wittenberg.

After Elector Frederick Augustus I of Saxony joined the Confederation of the Rhine in the Treaty of Posen, the Electoral Circle was renamed on 30 January 1807 to the Wittenberg Circle. That year the districts in the Burgraviate of Magdeburg and County of Barby were reassigned to the King of Westphalia, who annexed them to the Department of the Elbe.

In order to contribute to the "restoration of order and peace in Europe", on 18 May 1815 Prussia and Saxony entered a peace and friendship treaty in which Saxony ceded three-fifths of its territory to Prussia. On 22 May 1815, the Prussian state organised the territories it had acquired, along with other territories acquired as a result of the Napoleonic wars and the Altmark, into the Province of Saxony, which was subdivided into the three administrative districts of Magdeburg, Merseburg and Erfurt. The Electoral Circle then comprised an area of 66 square miles with 140,000 inhabitants.

References 

History of Saxony